The RDM (Radar Doppler Multifunction), also known as the Cyrano 5, is a French multimode pulse-Doppler radar developed by Thomson-CSF (now Thales) for export variants and early French models of the Mirage 2000 fighter aircraft. It is an evolution of the Cyrano IV installed on the Mirage F-1 and in turn was developed into the RDI (Radar Doppler à Impulsions), a specialist air-to-air radar for French Mirage 2000 interceptors, and the multimode RDY (Radar Doppler Multitarget), which could track more targets at a time and added further air-to-ground modes.

History
The first prototype of the RDM flew in January 1980 and production deliveries began in early 1983. Thomson funded development of the RDM from the Cyrano IV at a cost of FFr350m (~US$50m); the RDI air intercept derivative was funded by the French government. The RDM was intended for export Mirage 2000's and the first 50 for the French Air Force; the remaining 150 French Mirage 2000C's would have the RDI. In the end only 37 aircraft were fitted with the RDM, the first production RDI was delivered in December 1986. Allegedly the French Air Force would have preferred to wait until the RDI was ready and have an all-RDI fleet, but the government insisted that they take aircraft with RDM so that it could be marketed abroad as the front-line radar of France.

Design
RDM operates in the X-band with a coherent travelling-wave-tube transmitter and an inverted-Cassegrain antenna  in diameter. The RDM operates in air defence/air superiority, strike and air-to-sea modes. In the air-to-air role, the system can look up or down, range while searching, track-while-scan, provide continuous tracking, generate aiming signals for air combat and compute attack and firing envelopes. For the strike role it provides real-beam ground-mapping, navigation updating, contour-mapping, terrain-avoidance, blind let-down, air-to-ground ranging and Ground Moving Target Indication (GMTI).

In the maritime role it provides long-range search, track-while-scan and continuous tracking and can designate targets for active missiles. For air-to-air combat, the RDM provides a 120° cone of coverage, the antenna scanning at either 50 or 100°/s, with ±60, ±30 or ±15° scan.  For air-to-air gun attacks, the 3.5° beam can be locked to the target at up to  range, with automatic tracking within the head-up display field of view, or in a 'super-search' area, or in a vertical search mode. Options include a Continuous Wave Illuminator (CWI) and Doppler Beam Sharpening (DBS). Comprehensive Electronic Counter-Countermeasures (ECCM) are incorporated.

See also
 AI.24 Foxhunter - contemporary British radar on the Tornado F3
 AN/APG-63 radar family - contemporary US radar on the F-15 Eagle
 RBE2 - Radar à Balayage Electronique 2, radar on the Rafale

Notes and references

Aircraft radars
Military radars of France
Post–Cold War military equipment of France